Bloxham is a village in Oxfordshire on the edge of the Cotswolds in the central part of England.

Bloxham may also refer to:

 Bloxham (surname)
 Bloxham, Florida, an unincorporated community, United States
 Bloxham County, Florida, United States, a proposed county
 HMS Bloxham, a Hunt-class minesweeper
 Bloxham Stockbrokers, an Irish stockbroking firm

See also
 Bloxham School
 Bloxam